Glasgow Cathcart was a burgh constituency represented in the House of Commons of the Parliament of the United Kingdom from 1918 until 2005, when it was replaced by the larger Glasgow South constituency.

It elected one Member of Parliament (MP) using the first-past-the-post voting system.

Boundaries
1950–1974: The County of the City of Glasgow wards of Cathcart and Langside, and part of Govanhill ward.

1974–1983: The County of the City of Glasgow ward of Cathcart, and part of Langside ward.

1983–1997: The City of Glasgow District electoral divisions of King's Park/Aitkenhead, Linn Park/Castlemilk, and Pollokshaws/Newlands.

1997–2005: The City of Glasgow District electoral divisions of Battlefield/Croftfoot, Carnwadric/Newlands, and Castlemilk/Carmunnock.

History
For generations, Glasgow Cathcart was an extremely safe Conservative seat and for fifty-six years, the constituency always returned a Conservative MP. The area was the wealthiest part of the city and was mainly inhabited by "well to do" business families and contained large detached houses. It was Glasgow's equivalent of Kensington and Chelsea in London. However, when Labour won the general election in 1964, Glasgow had a lot of slum clearance and a lot of council housing was built in the Cathcart area, and areas which had previously been fields now housed the families from the old slums. These families naturally voted Labour and time and time, again the Conservative majorities dwindled. In 1966, the Conservative majority fell to a record low of 1,200 votes.

In 1970, the Conservatives increased their majority to around 5,000 but at the next two general elections in 1974 it soon fell again. In 1979, when Margaret Thatcher took office, the Conservatives lost the seat to Labour, against the national trend where there was a large swing to the Conservatives. After redrawn boundaries were made in 1983, the seat was notionally Conservative but like 1979 the seat went against the national trend and the Labour MP increased his majority. From 1983 to 1997, the Conservatives lost more ground time after time except for a small improvement in 1992 (inline with the national trend in Scotland, which ran counter to that across the United Kingdom). In 1997, Labour won a landslide victory in which the Conservatives lost all their seats in Scotland, and the seat became a safe Labour seat.

Since then, the Conservatives had fallen into third and fourth place. The seat still has more Conservative voters than any other Glasgow constituency, but only 5,000 at the last election when it was replaced by Glasgow South.

Members of Parliament

Election results

Elections in the 1910s

Elections in the 1920s

Elections in the 1930s

Elections in the 1940s

Elections in the 1950s

Elections in the 1960s

Elections in the 1970s

Elections in the 1980s

Elections in the 1990s

The boundaries of the seat were significantly re-drawn between 1992 and 1997.

Elections in the 2000s

References

Historic parliamentary constituencies in Scotland (Westminster)
Constituencies of the Parliament of the United Kingdom established in 1918
Constituencies of the Parliament of the United Kingdom disestablished in 2005
Politics of Glasgow
Govanhill and Crosshill